Ajit Kumar Chaturvedi is an Indian professor, education administrator and former director of IIT Roorkee. Previously, he has been the Dean (R&D), and currently Deputy Director at IIT Kanpur. He has largely contributed to waveform shaping and sequence design, MIMO systems. Recently, he has been bestowed with additional charge of director (acting) of newly established IIT Mandi.

Awards, honors and fellowships
Tan Chin Tuan Fellowship of Nanyang Technical University, Singapore (2008).
INSA Teacher award (2017)
Distinguished Teacher award of IIT Kanpur (2007)
Thrice (2002, 2006 and 2012) supervisor of the B.Tech. Project (BTP) group that won the Best BTP award
Plenary speaker at the 15th National Conference on Communications (2009)
Mentor of the team that won the Microsoft Award for Innovation at the World Finals of theIEEE Computer Society International Design Contest in 2002

Education
PhD, Electrical Engineering, IIT Kanpur, 1995
M. Tech., Electrical Engineering, IIT Kanpur, 1988
B. Tech., Electrical Engineering, IIT Kanpur, 1986

Selected bibliography

Articles

S Chandan, P Sandeep, and AK Chaturvedi, "A family of ISI-free polynomial pulses," Communications Letters, IEEE 9 (6), 496-498 (2005)
P Sandeep, S Chandan, and AK Chaturvedi, "ISI-free pulses with reduced sensitivity to timing errors," Communications Letters, IEEE 9 (4), 292-294 (2005)
R Appuswamy and AK Chaturvedi, "A new framework for constructing mutually orthogonal complementary sets and ZCZ sequences," Information Theory, IEEE Transactions on 52 (8), 3817-3826 (2006)
G Manglani and AK Chaturvedi, "Application of computational geometry to multiuser detection in CDMA," Communications, IEEE Transactions on 54 (2), 204-207 (2006)
RU Mahesh and AK Chaturvedi, "Closed form BER expressions for BPSK OFDM systems with frequency offset," Communications Letters, IEEE 14 (8), 731-733 (2010)

Conference proceedings

References

Living people
IIT Kanpur alumni
Academic staff of IIT Kanpur
Indian Institute of Technology directors
Year of birth missing (living people)